"The Way Love Is" is a song recorded by German musician known under the pseudonym of Captain Hollywood Project. It was released in 1995 as the third and last single from his second album, Animals or Human (1995). Featuring vocals by singer Petra Spiegl, it was a moderate hit in Germany, where it peaked at number 71.

Music video
The accompanying music video for "The Way Love Is" was directed by Rainer Thieding. He had previously directed the video for "Flying High".

Track listing

Charts

References

 

1995 songs
1995 singles
Blow Up singles
Captain Hollywood Project songs
English-language German songs
Music videos directed by Rainer Thieding
Songs written by Nosie Katzmann